Ronald Vincent Mollatt (24 February 1932 in Edwinstowe, England – 2001) was an English footballer.

1932 births
2001 deaths
People from Edwinstowe
Footballers from Nottinghamshire
English footballers
Association football midfielders
Leeds United F.C. players
York City F.C. players
Bradford City A.F.C. players
Frickley Athletic F.C. players
English Football League players